Mark Anthony Fagan (17 November 1873 – 31 December 1947) was a New Zealand politician of the Labour Party and a union secretary. He was Speaker of the Legislative Council from 1939 until his death.

Biography

Early life
Fagan was born at Gaffneys Creek, Victoria, Australia, in 1873, and went to school in Waratah, Tasmania until he was 10. He then worked in various Australian towns as a miner. By the time he came to New Zealand about 1900, he had split from his first wife. In the West Coast mining community he was the "voice of thoughtful militancy in the 'Red' federation" of Labour. His second marriage was to Monica McKittrick (née Gardiner), a widow with three children whom he married on 10 September 1917 in Christchurch.

Political career

Fagan was expected by many to stand in the 1918 Grey by-election after the sitting member, Paddy Webb, was jailed for his vocal opposition to conscription, but the Labour Party hierarchy chose Harry Holland from Wellington instead based on the latter's strong showing in the Wellington North by-election a few months prior. Fagan stood in the 1925 general election in the Motueka electorate, but was beaten by the incumbent, Richard Hudson of the Reform Party. In 1928, he moved to Petone in the Hutt Valley and in the following year, he was the organiser for Walter Nash's successful Hutt by-election. Fagan was on Labour's National Executive from 1930.

On 11 June 1930 he was appointed to the Legislative Council by the United Government, and at the end of each seven-year term, he was reappointed twice. He was Speaker from 18 July 1939 until his death. He was a Minister without portfolio in the first Labour Government from 6 December 1935 until 18 July 1939, and was acting Minister of Customs in 1939 when Walter Nash was overseas.

In 1935, he was awarded the King George V Silver Jubilee Medal.

Death
His wife Monica died in 1932, being survived by three daughters from her first marriage.  He died in Petone, Wellington on 31 December 1947. The Fagans are buried at Karori Cemetery.

Notes

References

1873 births
1947 deaths
Australian emigrants to New Zealand
Speakers of the New Zealand Legislative Council
Members of the Cabinet of New Zealand
New Zealand Labour Party MLCs
Wellington Harbour Board members
Social Democratic Party (New Zealand) politicians
Members of the New Zealand Legislative Council
Unsuccessful candidates in the 1925 New Zealand general election
Burials at Karori Cemetery